One Port Center is an office building  in Camden, New Jersey located in the Camden Waterfront. The building, opened in 1996, was designed by Michael Graves and is headquarters to the Delaware River Port Authority.

The building is situated on a L-shaped site flanks an existing parking garage, the other of which side is a planned future companion building. The location offers panoramic views of  the Delaware River and Philadelphia. The eleven-story, 176,000-square-foot building accommodates retail shops and a restaurant at the ground floor. There are four floors of leased office space and six floors of offices for the Port Authority. The executive offices and boardroom are located on the top floor behind three-story yellow aluminum composite columns. The blue and white glazed brick used at the lower speaks to the waterfront location.

In 2021 the DRPA installed a 1 MW solar canopy covering its parking lot.

See also
List of tallest buildings in Camden

References 

Michael Graves buildings
Buildings and structures in Camden, New Jersey
Delaware River Port Authority
Skyscrapers in New Jersey
Skyscraper office buildings in New Jersey
Office buildings completed in 1996
1996 establishments in New Jersey